Acacia muriculata, commonly known as Koolanooka wattle, is a shrub belonging to the genus Acacia and the subgenus Phyllodineae that is endemic to a small area of south western Australia.

Description
Like most species of Acacia it has phyllodes rather than true leaves.

Taxonomy
The species was first formally described by the botanists Bruce Maslin and Carrie Buscumb in 2007 as a part of the work Two new species of Acacia (Leguminosae: Mimosoideae) from the Koolanooka Hills in the northern wheatbelt region of south-west Western Australia as published in the journal Nuytsia. It is thought to be closely related to Acacia aculeiformis and Acacia botrydion.

Distribution
It is native to a small area near Morawa in the Mid West region of Western Australia where it is commonly situated on hill crests and slopes growing in soils over and around laterite and ironstone. It is usually found growing in loamy soils as a part of mallee shrubland communities.

See also
 List of Acacia species

References

muriculata
Acacias of Western Australia
Taxa named by Bruce Maslin
Plants described in 2007